Jo Prestia (born 5 June 1960 in Porto Empedocle) is an Italian born French kick boxer and actor. He has appeared in more than seventy films since 1996 and is best known for his performance as Le Tenia in the controversial 2002 film, Irréversible.

Fight record

|- bgcolor="#fbb"
| 1996- || Loss || align=left| Saimai Chor Suananan || ||  France || Decision || 5 || 3:00

|- bgcolor="#fbb"
| 1995-11-17 || Loss || align=left| Dany Bill || || Levallois-Perret, France || Decision (Unanimous) || 5 || 3:00
|-
! style=background:white colspan=9 |

|-  bgcolor="#cfc"
| 1995- || Win||align=left| Aymah Lukbanmao ||  || Thailand || KO (Punches)|| 5 || 

|- bgcolor="#cfc"
| 1993- || Win || align=left| J.V Eguzkiza || ISKA|| Marbella, Spain || Decision  || 9 || 2:00

|-  bgcolor="#cfc"
| 1992- || Win||align=left| Samaisuk Chuwattana ||  || Paris, France || Decision || 5 || 3:00 

|-  bgcolor="#fbb"
| 1992-10-03 || Loss ||align=left| Coban Lookchaomaesaitong ||  || Levallois-Perret, France || Decision || 5 || 3:00 
|-
! style=background:white colspan=9 |

|-  style="background:#cfc;"
| 1992-06-20 || Win ||align=left| Ramon Dekkers || || Paris, France || Decision (Unanimous) || 5 || 3:00 
|-
! style=background:white colspan=9 |

|-  style="background:#fbb;"
| 1992-04-09 || Loss ||align=left| Ramon Dekkers || || Paris, France || Decision (Unanimous) || 5 || 3:00 

|-  style="background:#fbb;"
| 1991-02-16 || Loss||align=left| Somsong Kiathoranee || || Valencienne, France || TKO (Low kicks) || 5 ||
|-
! style=background:white colspan=9 |

|-  style="background:#cfc;"
| 1991-01- || Win ||align=left| Somsong Kiathoranee || || Paris, France || KO (Punches) || 4 ||  
|-
! style=background:white colspan=9 |

|-  style="background:#cfc;"
| 1990-12- || Win ||align=left| Sannarong Kiathoranee || || Paris, France || KO (Punches) || 4 ||  

|-  style="background:#cfc;"
| 1990-11-23 || Win ||align=left| Joel Cesar|| || Paris, France || Decision || 5 || 3:00 

|-  style="background:#fbb;"
| 1989-12-31 || Loss||align=left| Cherry Sor Wanich || 2 vs 1  || Paris, France || Decision  || 5 || 3:00
|-
! style=background:white colspan=9 |

|-  style="background:#fbb;"
| 1988 || Loss||align=left| Lamkhong Sitwaywat ||   || France || Decision || 5 || 3:00 

|-  style="background:#fbb;"
| 1988 || Loss||align=left| Lamkhong Sitwaywat ||   || France || Decision || 5 || 3:00 

|-  bgcolor="#fbb"
| 1988-05-14 || Loss||align=left| Bruno Benlabed ||  || France || Decision|| 5 || 3:00
|-
! style=background:white colspan=9 |

|-  style="background:#fbb;"
| 1988- || Loss||align=left| Kitty Sor.Thanikul ||   || France || TKO (Corner stoppage)|| 4 || 

|-  style="background:#fbb;"
| 1987-1988 || Loss||align=left| Wattana Soudareth ||   || France || Decision || 5 || 3:00 

|-  style="background:#cfc;"
| 1987-1988 || Win ||align=left| Wattana Soudareth ||   || France || Decision || 5 || 3:00 

|-  style="background:#fbb;"
| 1987-1988 || Loss||align=left| Wattana Soudareth ||   || France || Decision || 5 || 3:00 

|-  bgcolor="#cfc"
| 1985- || Win||align=left| Bruno Benlabed ||  || Valencienne, France || Decision|| 5 || 3:00

|-  bgcolor="#cfc"
| 1985- || Win||align=left| Mohamed Jami ||  || France || Decision|| 5 || 3:00
|-
! style=background:white colspan=9 |

|-  bgcolor="#fbb"
| ? || Loss||align=left| Payakdam ||  || Hong Kong || Decision || 5 ||3:00 

|-  bgcolor="#fbb"
| 1984-10-26 || Loss||align=left| Ronnie Green ||  || Manchester, England || Decision || 5 ||3:00 
|-
| colspan=9 | Legend:

Selected filmography
 1998: The Dreamlife of Angels as Fredo
 2002: Irréversible
 2004: 36 Quai des Orfèvres
 2005: I Saw Ben Barka Get Killed
 2005: 13 Tzameti
 2007: Ill Wind
 2008: Rivoallan (short) as Rivoallan
 2009: The Horde as José
 2014: Colt 45 as Marco
 2017: Alibi.com as Prosper

References

External links 

1960 births
Living people
People from Porto Empedocle
20th-century French male actors
21st-century French male actors
French male film actors
Sportspeople from the Province of Agrigento
Actors from Sicily